The Photographer is a 2000 American comedy film directed by Jeremy Stein. It revolves around a photographer who has a single evening to find 10 magical photographs, or else he stands to lose everything that is important to him.

Plot
A year after becoming the toast of New York City's art scene, photographer Max Martin has lost his ability to take a decent picture. On the night before his make-or-break gallery opening, surrounded by the trappings of success, but devoid of inspiration, Max embarks on a bizarre trek through the city in search of 10 mysterious photographs that could save his career. Accompanied by an unlikely crew of strangers he meets along the way, Max trips through a modern-day Oz, and rediscovers the easily forgotten value of seeing magic reflected in everyday life.

Cast
A number of notable members of the New York independent film scene made appearances in the movie.

References

External links
 
 

2000 films
2000 comedy films
2000s English-language films
2000s American films
American comedy films
English-language comedy films